John Paul Vincent "Sonny" Vaccaro (born September 23, 1939 in Trafford, Pennsylvania) is an American former sports marketing executive. He lives in Santa Monica, California.

Career

Vaccaro is best known for his tenure with Nike, Inc., where he signed Michael Jordan to his first sneaker deal.  Vaccaro left Nike for Adidas, then Reebok.  He founded the ABCD Camp, an elite showcase of high school basketball standouts, which ran from 1984 to 2007.  It featured future stars Kobe Bryant, Dwight Howard, and LeBron James.  Vaccaro cofounded the first national high school All-Star game, The Dapper Dan Roundball Classic, with concert promoter and boyhood friend Pat DiCesare in Pittsburgh in 1965.  The game endured for 43 years and its alumni includes such greats as Calvin Murphy, Shaquille O'Neal, Kobe Bryant, Chris Webber, Alonzo Mourning, Kevin Garnett, Vince Carter, Tracy McGrady, Patrick Ewing, Rasheed Wallace and Stephon Marbury.

Vaccaro and basketball coach George Raveling had been close friends, to the point that Raveling was the best man at Sonny's second wedding. Raveling had a falling out with Sonny over the business of summer high school basketball camps that Sonny ran. Raveling became Sonny's competitor in the same position at Nike.
Vaccaro was a key figure in the O'Bannon v. NCAA lawsuit, which allowed players to be compensated.  Vaccaro helped to recruit Ed O'Bannon for the case.

Legacy
An ESPN 30 for 30 documentary about Vaccaro entitled "Sole Man" aired on April 16, 2015. The show was themed around the "corrosive effect of pumping so much marketing money into the college game."

Ben Affleck and Matt Damon are producing a film called Air about his signing of Michael Jordan for Nike and ultimately the Air Jordan brand. Damon plays Sonny in the film.

References

External links
 The Shame of College Sports in The Atlantic

1939 births
Living people
People from Trafford, Pennsylvania
American people of Italian descent
Businesspeople from Pennsylvania
Adidas people
American sports businesspeople
Nike, Inc. people